Quamichan Lake (Raven Field) Airport  is located  north northeast of Duncan, adjacent to Quamichan Lake, British Columbia, Canada.

The airfield is owned and operated by John Howroyd, who also owns Quamichan Lake (Raven Field) Water Aerodrome.

The airfield uses runway 16 for departures, and runway 34 for landings.

See also
 List of airports on Vancouver Island

References

Registered aerodromes in British Columbia
Cowichan Valley